Bjerka is a village in the municipality of Hemnes in Nordland county, Norway.

References

Hemnes
Villages in Nordland